Northeast China or Northeastern China is a geographical region of China, which is often referred to as "Manchuria" or "Inner Manchuria" by surrounding countries and the West. It usually corresponds specifically to the three provinces east of the Greater Khingan Range, namely Liaoning, Jilin, and Heilongjiang, but historically is meant to also encompass the four easternmost prefectures of Inner Mongolia west of the Greater Khingan. It is separated from Russian Far East to the north by the Amur, Argun, and Ussuri rivers; from Korea to the south by the Yalu and Tumen Rivers; and from Inner Mongolia to the west by the Greater Khingan and parts of the Xiliao River.

Due to the shrinking of its once-powerful industrial sector and decline of its economic growth and population, the region is often referred to as China's Rust Belt. As a result, a campaign named Northeast Area Revitalization Plan was launched in the 2000s by the State Council of the People's Republic of China, in which five prefectures of eastern Inner Mongolia, namely Hulunbuir, Hinggan, Tongliao, Chifeng and Xilin Gol, are also formally defined as regions of the Northeast.

Names

Northeastern China is known in Chinese contexts as simply the Northeast or Dōngběi, from the Mandarin pronunciation of its Chinese name.

The area has long been known in Indo-European languages as Manchuria, as it was the homeland of the Manchu people who established and ruled the Qing dynasty of China from the 17th to early 20th century. The name was not used by the Qing government itself, who called the area their "Three East" or "Eastern Provinces", and its use is discouraged by the People's Republic of China, which associates the exonym with Manchukuo, a puppet state of Imperial Japan, though these are separate terms in most languages. It is known more specifically as  when it needs to be distinguished from Outer Manchuria, which was ceded by Qing China to the Russian Empire through the Amur Annexation in the 1850s.

Historically, the area was also known as Liaoyang (from its capital at Liaoyang) under the Yuan; as Nurgan (from its capital at Tyr) under the Ming dynasty; and as Guanwai or Guandong, meaning "Lands beyond" or "Lands East of the Pass" in reference to the strategic Shanhai Pass between Hebei and Liaoning. Under Japanese occupation, the name Guandong was more specifically associated with the Kwantung Leased Territory around Dalian, "Kwan-tung" being the same name in Wade-Giles romanization.

Administrative divisions

Cities with urban area over one million in population 
 Provincial capitals in bold.

History 

Northeast China was the homeland of several ethnic groups, including the Koreans, Manchus (or Jurchens), Ulchs, Hezhen (also known as the Goldi and Nanai). Various ethnic groups and their respective kingdoms, including the Sushen, Xianbei, and Mohe have risen to power in Northeast China. The region came under the rule of various states throughout history, including Yan, Jizi Chaoxian, Weiman Chaoxian, Fuyu, Western Han, Gaogouli, Xin dynasty, Eastern Han, Gongsun Yan, Cao Wei, Western Jin, Former Yan, Former Qin, Later Yan, Tang dynasty, Wu Zhou, Bohai, Liao dynasty, Jin dynasty, Eastern Liao, Later Liao, Eastern Xia, Mongol Empire, Yuan dynasty, Northern Yuan, Ming dynasty, Qing dynasty, and Republic of China.

During the late Qing dynasty, Northeast China came under influence of the Russian Empire with the building of the Chinese Eastern Railway through Harbin to Vladivostok. The Empire of Japan replaced Russian influence in the region as a result of the Russo-Japanese War in 1904–1905, and Japan laid the South Manchurian Railway in 1906 to Port Arthur. During the Warlord Era in the Republic of China, Zhang Zuolin established himself in Northeast China, but was murdered by the Japanese for being too independent. The last Qing emperor, Puyi, was then placed on the throne to lead a Japanese puppet state of Manchukuo. After the atomic bombing of Japan in 1945, the Soviet Union invaded the region as part of its declaration of war against Japan. From 1945 to 1948, Northeast China was a base area for the Communist People's Liberation Army in the Chinese Civil War. With the encouragement of the Soviet Union, the area was used as a staging ground during the Civil War for the Chinese Communists, who were victorious in 1949 and have been controlling this region since.

Demographics 

Northeast China has a total population of about 107,400,000 people, accounting for 8% of China's total population. The overwhelming majority of the population in the Northeast is Han Chinese, many of whose ancestors came in the 19th and 20th centuries during a migration movement called "Chuang Guandong". Northeast China historically had a significant Han Chinese population, reaching over 3 million by the end of Ming Dynasty, but they were subjected to eviction and assimilation by the conquest of the Qing Dynasty, who then set up Willow Palisades during the reign of Shunzhi Emperor and prohibited any settlement of Han Chinese into the region. Despite officially prohibiting Han Chinese settlement, by the 18th century the Qing decided to settle Han into the Northeast so that Han Chinese farmed 500,000 hectares in the region by the 1780s. Besides moving into the Liao area in southern Manchuria, the path linking Jinzhou, Fengtian, Tieling, Changchun, Hulun, and Ningguta was settled by Han Chinese during the Qianlong Emperor's reign, and Han Chinese were the majority in urban areas of Manchuria by 1800.
This resulted in the local Han Chinese population growing to over 20 million before the Second Sino-Japanese War. After the establishment of the People's Republic of China at the end of the Chinese Civil War, further immigrations were organized by the Central Government to "develop the Great Northern Wilderness", eventually peaking the population over 100 million people.

Because most people in Northeast China trace their ancestries back to the migrants from the Chuang Guandong era, Northeastern Chinese were more culturally uniform compared to other geographical regions of China. People from the Northeast would first identify themselves as "Northeasterners" before affiliating to individual provinces and cities/towns.

Ethnic Manchus form the second significant ethnic group in Northeast China, followed by the Mongols, Koreans, and the Huis, as well as 49 other ethnic minorities such as Daurs, Sibos, Hezhens, Oroqens, Evenks, and Kyrgyz. Located in the Northeast is the Yanbian Korean Autonomous Prefecture where ethnic Koreans make up roughly 35% of the population.

Religion 

Taoism and Chinese Buddhism coexist alongside predominating Chinese folk religions led by local shamans. The region has also a strong presence of folk religions and Confucian churches.

Economy 
The Northeast was one of the earliest regions to industrialize in China during the era of Manchukuo. After the founding of the People's Republic of China, Northeast China continued to be a major industrial base of the country, and has been hailed as "the Republic's eldest son". Recent years, however, have seen the stagnation of Northeast China's heavy-industry-based economy, as China's economy continues to liberalize and privatize; the government has initialized the Revitalize the Northeast campaign to counter this problem, and established the Northeast Summit to improve policy coordination and integration. The region has experienced difficulty distancing itself from a planned economy, a legacy that began in 1905 with the establishment of the Japanese sphere of influence there. The region's once-abundant raw materials have also depleted and the economy has suffered from bureaucratic inefficiency and protectionist politics.

The region is, on the whole, more heavily urbanised than most parts of China, largely because it was the first part of the country to develop heavy industry owing to its abundant coal reserves. Major cities include Shenyang, Dalian, Harbin, Changchun and Anshan, all with several million inhabitants. Other cities include the steel making centres of Fushun and Anshan in Liaoning, Jilin City in Jilin, and Qiqihar and Mudanjiang in Heilongjiang. Harbin, more than any other city in China, possesses significant Russian influences: there are many Orthodox churches that have fallen out of use since the Cultural Revolution. Shenyang and Dalian, meanwhile, have sizable populations of Japanese and South Koreans due to their traditional linkages.

The rural population of the Northeast is heavily concentrated in the warmer southern part of the area, where very warm to hot summer weather permits crops such as maize and millet to be grown with high yields. Soybeans and flax are also very important, as are wheat and barley. The region possesses large flocks of sheep, and pigs are abundant in the more densely settled southern part. The northern half of Heilongjiang is so cold and poorly drained that agriculture is almost impossible; however, the Amur River provides very rich fishing prospects, and sheep are even more abundant than in southern Heilongjiang.

Northeast China is the country's traditional industrial base, focusing mainly on equipment manufacturing. Major industries include the steel, automobile, shipbuilding, aircraft manufacturing, and petroleum refining industries. The gross regional product of the three northeast provinces totaled ¥1.63 trillion in 2002. In recent years, the Chinese government has initialized the "Revitalize the Northeast campaign" to turn this region into one of China's economic growth engines. As of 2015 the region was losing population and the economy, dominated by state-owned enterprises, was stagnant.

Culture 

In general, the culture of Northeast China takes its elements from the cultures of North China and Shandong, the hometowns of most of the Han Chinese who migrated into Northeast China during the Chuang Guandong. Northeast China also takes cultural inspiration from the Tungusic peoples.

Dialects 
There are two main dialects of Mandarin Chinese spoken in Northeast China. 

The most widely spoken dialect is Northeastern Mandarin (called dongbeihua or 东北话), which is a very slight variant of the Standard Chinese but retains sporadic elements from native Tungusic languages, Korean and Russian. There are enough differences from Mandarin to give dongbeihua its own distinctive characteristics. 

The second dialect is Jiaoliao Mandarin, which is actually a Shandong dialect. Many residents in the southern fringe of the Liaodong region (mostly in Dalian and Dandong) speak Jiaoliao dialect.

Ethnic Manchus speak mostly Mandarin, and the Manchu language is almost extinct due to widespread assimilation to Han culture over the last four centuries. Ethnic Mongols tend to be bilingual in their own Mongolian tongues as well as Mandarin.

Cuisine 
Northeastern Chinese cuisine reflects the region's ethnic diversity, blending Northern Han, Manchu and Korean cooking styles. One of the distinguishing characteristics of the cuisine is the use of uncooked fresh vegetables. During the long winter season, pickled Chinese cabbage, which is called "suan cai", is preserved and used for cooking. Whereas rice is widely grown in south China, millet, wheat, and noodles are consumed more in Northeast China. In almost every other region of China, vegetables are cooked thoroughly before being eaten. Most of the meat dishes are based around pork due to how cold it can get. Often braised pork or dumplings are the main attraction of a meal. This region's cold climate makes it hard to grow or produce much of anything and growing seasons are correspondingly very short.

Folk dance and sports 
Errenzhuan, yangge, Jilin opera and stilts are popular forms of traditional entertainment in Northeast China. "Northeastern Cradle Song" is an example of the folk songs of this region.

Because of its climatic conditions, Northeast China is the base for China's winter sports. Ice hockey and ice skating athletes often come from or were educated in Northeast China.

Major universities 
Jilin University (吉林大学)
Northeast Agricultural University (东北农业大学)
Northeast Normal University (东北师范大学)
Harbin Institute of Technology (哈尔滨工业大学)
Northeastern University (东北大学)
Liaoning University (辽宁大学)
Shenyang Agricultural University (沈阳农业大学)
Shenyang University of Chemical Technology (沈阳化工大学)
Dalian University of Technology (大连理工大学)
Dalian Maritime University (大连海事大学)
Northeast Forestry University (东北林业大学)
Shenyang Normal University (沈阳师范大学)
Changchun University of Science and Technology (长春理工大学)
Northeast Petroleum University (东北石油大学)
Shenyang Aerospace University (沈阳航空航天大学)
Harbin Engineering University (哈尔滨工程大学)
Heilongjiang University (黑龙江大学)
Dongbei University of Finance and Economics (东北财经大学)

See also 
 Outer Northeast China (Outer Manchuria)
 Northeast Area Revitalization Plan

Notes

References

Citations

Sources 

 Thomas R. Gottschang and Diana Lary: Swallows and Settlers - The Great Migration from North China to Manchuria, Centre for Chinese Studies, The University of Michigan, Ann Arbor 2000. .
 Michael Meyer: In Manchuria: A Village Called Wasteland and the Transformation of Rural China, Bloomsbury Press, 2015, 
 Lenore Lamont Zissermann: Mitya's Harbin; Majesty and Menace, Book Publishers Network, 2016. .

External links 

The Provincial Government of Liaoning
The Provincial Government of Heilongjiang
The Provincial Government of Jilin

 
Regions of China
.
Inner Asia
China
China